Arnaldo Pambianco (16 August 1935 – 6 July 2022) was an Italian professional road racing cyclist who was active between 1956 and 1966. The highlight of his career was his overall win in the 1961 Giro d'Italia. He competed at the 1956 Summer Olympics in the road race and finished in seventh individually and fourth with the Italian team.

Career achievements

Major results

1956
 Summer Olympics
4th Team time trial
7th Road race
1958
 8th Milano–Vignola
 9th Overall Giro di Sardegna
1959
 3rd Giro di Romagna
1960
 1st Milano–Torino
 2nd Overall Giro di Sardegna
 5th Giro dell'Emilia
 5th GP Forli
 7th Overall Tour de France
 7th Overall Giro d'Italia
1961
 1st  Overall Giro d'Italia
 2nd Road race, National Road Championships
 2nd Overall Giro di Sardegna
 2nd Coppa Bernocchi
 3rd GP Forli
 8th Coppa Sabatini
 10th Giro di Lombardia
1962
 2nd Trofeo Baracchi (with Ercole Baldini)
 4th Overall Four Days of Dunkirk
 4th Giro di Campania
 4th Giro di Romagna
 5th Road race, UCI Road World Championships
 5th Giro dell'Emilia
 7th Tre Valli Varesine
 8th Overall Giro di Sardegna
 10th Giro del Lazio
1963
 1st Overall Giro di Sardegna
 1st Stage 18 Giro d'Italia
1964
 1st Brabantse Pijl
 4th Giro di Romagna
1965
 2nd Giro di Romagna
1966
 10th Overall Paris–Nice

Grand Tour general classification results timeline

References

External links

1935 births
2022 deaths
People from Bertinoro
Italian male cyclists
Giro d'Italia winners
Italian Giro d'Italia stage winners
Cyclists at the 1956 Summer Olympics
Olympic cyclists of Italy
Cyclists from Emilia-Romagna
Sportspeople from the Province of Forlì-Cesena